The Lombard Insurance Classic is a golf tournament on the Sunshine Tour. It has been played annually since 2007 at the Royal Swazi Spa Country Club in Ezulwini Valley, Eswatini.

Winners

External links
Sunshine Tour's official site

Sunshine Tour events
Golf tournaments in Eswatini
Recurring sporting events established in 2007
2007 establishments in Swaziland